Mirian Burduli (born 6 January 1991) is a Georgian rugby union player. He plays for Georgia and for US Carcassonne in Pro D2.

References

1991 births
Living people
Expatriate rugby union players from Georgia (country)
Expatriate rugby union players in France
Rugby union players from Georgia (country)
Expatriate sportspeople from Georgia (country) in France
US Montauban players
Rugby union props